, born Masaru Okumura (奥村 勝), was a Japanese actor best known for playing Ogami Ittō, the scowling, 19th-century ronin warrior in the six Lone Wolf and Cub samurai films.

Biography
Wakayama (his stage name) was born on September 1, 1929, in Fukagawa, a district in Tokyo, Japan. His father was Minoru Okumura (奥村 実), a noted kabuki performer and nagauta singer who went by the stage name Katsutōji Kineya (杵屋 勝東治), and the family as a whole were kabuki performers. He and his younger brother, Shintaro Katsu, followed their father in the theater. Wakayama tired of this; at the age of 13, he began to study judo, eventually achieving the rank of 4th dan black belt in the art.

In 1952, as part of the Azuma Kabuki troupe, Wakayama toured the United States of America for nine months. He gave up theater performance completely after his two-year term with the troupe was over. Wakayama taught judo until Toho recruited him as a new martial arts star in their jidaigeki movies, originally using the stage name "Jō Kenzaburō". He prepared for these movies by practicing other disciplines, including kenpō, iaidō, kendo, and bōjutsu. All this helped him for roles (now using the stage name "Wayakama Tomisaburō") in the television series The Mute Samurai, the 1975 television series Shokin Kasegi (The Bounty Hunter), and his most famous film role: Ogami Ittō, the Lone Wolf.

Wakayama went on to star in many films, performing in a variety of roles. It has been estimated that he appeared in between 250 and 500 films. His only roles in American movies were as a baseball coach in The Bad News Bears Go to Japan (1978) and as a yakuza boss, Sugai, in Ridley Scott's Black Rain (1989) that delivers a memorable English monologue that becomes a defining moment for the film, and the film's title.

Wakayama died of acute heart failure on April 2, 1992, in a hospital in Kyoto. He was survived by a son, Kiichirō Wakayama (若山 騎一郎) born in 1964, also an actor.

Filmography

Film
Wakayama appeared in the following films, amongst others.

1955–1959
 Banba no Chûtarô (1955) - Banba no Chutaro
 Uta matsuri mangetsu tanuki-gassen (1955)
 Gyakushu orochimaru (1955) - Toyama Yunosuke
 Silver Snake Iwashiya (1956)
 Yotsuya kaidan (1956) - Iemon Tamiya
 Ningyô Sashichi torimonochô: Yôen roku shibijin (1956) - Ningyo Sashichi
 Yôun Satomi kaikyoden (1956) - Inuzuka Shino
 Ningyô Sashichi torimonochô: Ôedo Ushimitsudoki (1957) - Ningyo Sashichi
 Ningyô Sashichi torimonochô: Hanayome Satsujinma (1957) - Ningyo Sashichi
 Kanhasshû ken kajin (1958)
 Ningyô Sashichi torimonochô: Ukiyoburo no Shibijin (1958) - Ningyo Sashichi
 Ningyô Sashichi torimonochô: Koshimoto Irezumi Shibijin (1958) - Ningyo Sashichi
 Doto no taiketsu (1959)
 Fukaku hichô (1959)
 Fukaku hichô: kanketsuhen (1959)
 Chiyari musô (1959)
 Hibari torimonochô: furisode koban (1959)
 Yukinojô henge (1959)
 Hayate monzaburo (1959)
 Rage (1959)

1960-1969

 Hibari no mori no ishimatsu (1960) - Shimizu No Jirocho - Boss Of The Tokaido
 Tenpô rokkasen - Jigoku no hanamichi (1960)
 Jirochô kesshôki: Nagurikomi kôjinyama (1960) - Okita Soji
 Tenryu haha koi gasa (1960)
 Shoretsu shinsengumi - bakumatsu no doran (1960) - Okita Soji
 Oja kissa (1960)
 Ninkyo Nakasendo (1960) - Omasa
 Hibari Juhachiban Benten Kozo (1960)
 Hachisu chikemuri gasa (1961)
 Yami ni warau tekkamen (1961)
 Tekka Daimyo ("Lord of Steel Heart") (1961)
 Ghost of Oiwa (1961)
 Megitsune henge (1961)
 Kengo tengu matsuri (1961) - Iishiro Shurinosuke
 Kaidan Oiwa no borei (1961) - Tamiya Iemon
 Charinko kaido (1961)
 Kisaragi musô ken (1962) - Hayatomasa Tachibana
 Seizoroi kanhasshu (1962)
 Zatoichi 2 (1962)- Nagisa no Yoshirō (credited as Jō Kenzaburō)
 Ninja 1 (1962) - Oda Nobunaga
 Love for a Mother (1962)
 Shinsengumi shimatsuki (1963) - Isami Kondô (credited as Jō Kenzaburō)
 Teuchi (1963) - Shindo Genjiro
 Kaidan onibi no numa (1963) - Saburôta Nishina
 Ninja 2 (1963) - Oda Nobunaga
 Ninja 3 (1963) - Oda Nobunaga
 Maiko to ansatsusha (1963)
 Yôsô (1963) - Prime Minister
 Sleepy Eyes of Death: The Chinese Jade (1963) - Chen Sun (credited as Jō Kenzaburō)
 Hana no kodokan (1963)
 Zatoichi and the Chest of Gold (1964) - Jushiro
 Shinobi no mono: Zoku Kirigakure Saizô (1964) - Sanada Yukimura
 Meiji taitei goichidaiki (1964) - Soldier charging Chinese fortress
 Sleepy Eyes of Death: Sword of Seduction (1964) - Chen Sun (credited as Jō Kenzaburō)
 Ninja 4 (1964) - Sanada Yukimura
 Gaijin bôchi no ketto (1964)
 Kojiki taishō (1964)
 Virgin Witnessed (1966) - Gyôshun
 A Brave Generous Era (1966)
 Ôtazune mono shichinin (1966)
 Fraternal Honor: Three Brothers of Kanto (1966) - Akoshima Isamu
 Bakuchiuchi ("The Gambler) (1967)
 Zoku Toseinin (1967) - Sakamoto
 Toseinin (1967) - Hirose
 Hokkai yûkyôden (1967)
 Choueki juhachi-nen: kari shutsugoku (1967)
 Choueki juhachi-nen (1967)
 Bakuchi uchi (1967) - Ozeki Isamu
 Zenka mono (1968)
 Kaettekita gokudo (1968) - Shimamura Seikichi
 Ikasama bakuchi (1968)
 Hibotan bakuto ("Red Peony Gambler") (1968) - Torakichi Kumasaka
 Jinsei-gekijô: Hishakaku to kiratsune (1968)
 Hibotan bakuto: Isshuku ippan (1968) - Torakichi Kumazaka
 Bakuto retsuden (1968) - Adachi Sanji
 Yôen dokufu-den hannya no ohyaku (1968) - Boss Minokichi of Otowa
 Otoko no shobu: byakko no tetsu (1968)
 Kyôdai jingi gyakuen no sakazuki (1968)
 Heitai gokudo (1968)
 Ballad of Murder (1968)
 Gokudo (1968) - Shimamura Seikichi
 Wicked Priest (1968) - Mikuni Shinkai
 Daigashi (1968)
 Bakuchi-uchi: Socho tobaku (1968) - Tetsuo Matsuda
 Nunnery Confidential (1968)
 Hibotan bakuto: Hanafuda shôbu (1969) - Torakichi Kumasaka
 Tabi ni deta gokudo (1969) - Shimamura Seikichi
 Quick-draw Okatsu (1969) - Bounty hunter
 Shokin kasegi (1969) - Shikoru Ichibei
 Hissatsu bakuchi-uchi (1969)
 Red Peony: The Hanafuda Game (1969)
 Memoir of Japanese Assassins (1969)
 Gonin no Shôkin Kasegi (1969) - Shikoro Ichibei
 Tosei-nin Retsuden (1969) - Kaku
 Boss (1969) - Sakata Yoshinobu
 Nihon boryoku-dan: Kumicho (1969) - Miyahara
 Matteita gokudo (1969) - Shimamura Seikichi
 Gorotsuki butai (1969)
 Gokudô bôzu: Nenbutsu hitokiri tabi (1969)
 Gendai yakuza: Yotamono no okite (1969)
 Chôeki san kyôdai (1969)

1970–1979

 Hibotan bakuto: Oryû sanjô (1970) - Torakichi Kumasaka
 Bakuchi-uchi: Nagaremono (1970) - Yoshii Yusaku
 Nippon dabi katsukyu (1970)
 Saigo no tokkôtai (1970)
 Gokuaku bozu hitokiri kazoe uta (1970) - Shinkai
 Blind Yakuza Monk (1970) - Dr. Mitamura
 Thugs of Shinjuku (1970) - Senior yakuza at funeral (uncredited)
 Shiruku hatto no ô-oyabun: Chobi-hige no kuma (1970)
 Shiruku hatto no ô-oyabun (1970)
 Shin Abashiri Bangaichi: Fubuki no Hagure Okami (1970)
 Sengo hiwa, hoseki ryakudatsu (1970)
 Nihon boryoku-dan: Kumicho kuzure (1970)
 Hakurai jingi: Kapone no shatei (1970)
 Gokudo kyojo tabi (1970) - Shimamura Seikichi
 Gokudo Kamagasaki ni kaeru (1970) - Shimamura Seikichi
 Gokuaku bozu nenbutsu sandangiri (1970) - Shinkai
 Underground Syndicate (1970)
 Sympathy for the Underdog (1971) - Yonabaru - Koza downtown boss
 A Boss with the Samurai Spirit (1971) - Capone
 Bakuchi-uchi: Inochi-huda (1971) - Kobayashi Kanji
 Gokuaku bozu - Nomu utsu kau (1971)
 Nihon yakuza-den: Sôchiyô e no michi (1971) - Torakichi Ohmatsu
 Hibotan bakuto: Oinochi itadaki masu (1971) - Torakichi Kumasaka
 Kaoyaku (1971) - Hoshino
 Nippon akuninden (1971) - Kumai
 Nihon aku nin den (1971)
 Kizudarake no seishun (1971) - Mihashi Tetsuo
 Boryokudan sai buso (1971)
 Bakuto kirikomi-tai (1971) - Yano
 Akû oyabûn tai daigashî (1971)
 Hibotan bakuto: Jingi tooshimasu (1972)
 Lone Wolf and Cub: Sword of Vengeance (1972) - Ogami Ittō
 Kizu darake jinsei furui do de gonzansu (1972)
 Cherry Blossom Fire Gang (1972) - Master Kofusai Donju
 Lone Wolf and Cub: Baby Cart at the River Styx (1972) - Ogami Ittō
 Gokudo makari touru (1972) - Shimamura Seikichi
 Lone Wolf and Cub: Baby Cart to Hades (1972) - Ogami Ittō
 Kînagashî hyâkunîn (1972)
 Shôkin kubi: Isshun Hachi-nin Giri (1972) - Shikoro Ichibei
 Lone Wolf and Cub: Baby Cart in Peril (1972) - Ogami Ittō
 Nihon Aku Nin Den: Jigoku No Michizure (1972)
 Bakuchi-uchi Gaiden (1972)
 Sakura no Daimon (1973)
 Lone Wolf and Cub: Baby Cart in the Land of Demons (1973) - Ogami Itto
 Kamagasaki gokudo (1973) - Shimamura Seikichi, movie star
 Lone Wolf and Cub: White Heaven in Hell (1974) - Ogami Itto
 Gokudo VS Mamushi (1974)
 Datsugoku Hiroshima satsujinshû (1974) - Okamoto Seijiro
 New Battles Without Honor and Humanity (1974) - Aoki Naotake
 ESPY (1974) - Ulrov
 Gokudo VS furyô banchô (1974) - Shimamura Seikichi
 Gotô hoka sâtsujin shû (1975)
 Bôryoku kinmyaku (1975)
 Yukâi na gokudo (1976)
 Akuma no temari-uta (1977) - Inspector Isokawa
 Devil's Bouncing Ball Song (1977) - Tatsuo Honda
 Sugata Sanshiro (1977) - Murai
 Torakku yarô: Otoko ippiki momojirô (1977)
 The Bad News Bears Go to Japan (1978) - Coach Shimizu
 Hi no Tori ("The Phoenix") (1978) - Sarutahaiko, General of the Yamatai
 Oh My Son (1979) - Shuzo Kawase
 Distant Tomorrow (1979) - Iwasa

1980–1989
 Chichi yo haha yo! (1980) - Asakawa Senjo
 Shogun Assassin (1980) - Lone Wolf
 Seishun no mon ("The Gate of Youth") (1981) - Ryugoro Hanawa
 Flames of Blood (1981) - Seihachi
 Makai Tenshō ("Samurai Reincarnation") (1981) - Lord Tajima no Kami Munenori Yagyu
 Moeru yusha (1981) - Goro Kaji
 The Shootout (1982) - Yabuki
 Conquest (1982) - Tsuyoshi Gonno
 Irezumi: Spirit of Tattoo (1982) - Kyogoro / the Tatto Artist
 Shōsetsu Yoshida gakkō (1983) - Bukichi Miki
 Hakujasho (1983) - Ekai Kanamishima
 Jinsei gekijo ("Theater of Life") (1984)
 Shura no mure (1984)
 Story of the Yamashita Boy (1985) - Yamashita Taizo, Cho's father
 A Promise (1986) - Detective Tagami
 Michi (1986) - Naokichi Sakura
 Shinran: Shiroi michi ("Shinran: Path to Purity") (1987) - Homen
 Daireikai: Shindara dou naru (1989)
 Shaso (1989) - Kazuo Otagaki
 Black Rain (1989) - Sugai Kunio
 Tanba Tetsuro no daireikai shindara dounaru (1989) - God

1990
 Jotei: Kasuga no tsubone (1990)
 Checkmate (1991) - Sanae Mitamura

Television
Oshizamurai Kiichihōgan (1973-1974) - Kiichihōgan
Akuma no Yoūna Aitsu (1975) - Detective Shirato
Shokin Kasegi (1975) - Shikoro Ichibei
Tsūkai! Kōchiyama Sōshun (1975–76) - Tōyama Kinsirō
Fumō Chitai (1979) - Ichizo Daimon
Ōoku (1983) - Tokugawa Ieyasu
Kozure Ōkami Meifumadō no Shikyakunin Hahakoishi Daigoro Zetsushou (1989) - Yagyū Retsudō

References

External links
 

1929 births
1992 deaths
Japanese male film actors
Japanese male judoka
Male actors from Tokyo
20th-century Japanese male actors